The 2014 CIS football season began on September 1, 2014 with ten Ontario University Athletics teams playing that day. The season concluded on November 29 with the 50th Vanier Cup championship at Molson Stadium in Montreal. This year, 27 university teams in Canada are scheduled to play Canadian Interuniversity Sport football, the highest level of amateur Canadian football.

Regular season standings

Top 10 

Ranks in italics are teams not ranked in the top 10 poll but received votes.
NR = Not Ranked, received no votes.
Number in parentheses denotes number votes, after the dash number of first place votes.

Post-season awards

All-Canadian team 

 First team 
Offence
 QB – Andrew Buckley – Calgary
 RB – Dillon Campbell – Laurier
 RB – Mercer Timmis – Calgary
 IR – Brett Blaszko – Calgary
 IR – Mikhaïl Davidson – Montreal
 WR – Addison Richards – Regina
 WR – Nathaniel Behar – Carleton
 C – Sean McEwen – Calgary
 T – Karl Lavoie – Laval
 T – Edmund Meredith – Western
 G – Charles Vaillancourt – Laval
 G – Sean Jamieson – Western
Defence
 DT – Ettore Lattanzio – Ottawa
 DT – Daryl Waud – Western
 DE – Vincent Desloges – Laval
 DE – Jesse St. James – Acadia
 LB – Byron Archambault – Montreal
 LB – Adam Konar – Calgary
 LB – Jonathan Langa – Saint Mary's
 FS – Kwame Adjei – Mount Allison
 HB – Kristopher Robertson – Concordia
 HB – Chris Ackie – Laurier
 CB – Adam Laurensse – Calgary
 CB – Paolo Edwards – St. Francis Xavier
Special teams
 P – Boris Bede – Laval
 K – Tyler Crapigna – McMaster
 RET – Marcus Davis – British Columbia
 Second team 
Offence
 QB – Hugo Richard – Laval
 RB – Chris Reid – Mount Allison
 RB – Ronlee King-Fileen – Bishop's
 IR – Nic Demski – Manitoba
 IR – Danny Vandervoort – McMaster
 WR – Llevi Noel – Toronto
 WR – Sébastien Blanchard – Sherbrooke
 C – Jean-Christophe Labrecque – Montreal
 T – David Beard – Alberta
 T – Vernon Sainvil – St. Francis Xavier
 G – Sukh Chungh – Calgary
 G – Philippe Gagnon – Laval
Defence
 DT – Donovan Dale – British Columbia
 DT – Jacob LeBlanc – Mount Allison
 DE – Ricky Osei-Kusi – Western
 DE – Connor McGough – Calgary
 LB – Curtis Newton – Guelph
 LB – Drew Morris – Acadia
 LB – Nicholas Shortill – McMaster
 FS – Mark Ingram – Saskatchewan
 HB – Elie Bouka – Calgary
 HB – Demetrius Ferguson – St. Francis Xavier
 CB – Joey Cupido – McMaster
 CB – Josh Woodman – Western
Special teams
 P – Ronnie Pfeffer – Laurier
 K – Ryan Begin – Acadia
 RET – Ryan Nieuwesteeg – Guelph

Championships 
The Vanier Cup is played between the champions of the Mitchell Bowl and the Uteck Bowl, the national semi-final games. In 2014, according to the rotating schedule, the Atlantic conference Loney Bowl champions will visit the Ontario conference's Yates Cup champion for the Mitchell Bowl. The winners of the Canada West conference Hardy Trophy will visit the Dunsmore Cup Quebec championship team for the Uteck Bowl.

Playoff bracket 
The Vanier Cup is played between the champions of the Mitchell Bowl and the Uteck Bowl, the national semi-final games. In 2014, according to the rotating schedule, the Quebec conference Dunsmore Cup champions will host the Hardy Trophy Canada West championship team for the Uteck Bowl. The Atlantic conference Loney Bowl champions will visit the Ontario conference's Yates Cup winner for the Mitchell Bowl.

Number in parentheses represents seed in conference

Teams

References 

2014 in Canadian football
U Sports football seasons